Kairat Sarymsakov (born May 31, 1989) is a Kazakh Taekwondo athlete who won a bronze medal at the 2017 World Taekwondo Championships after being defeated by Nikita Rafalovich.

In 2017, he won the silver medal in the men's −74 kg event at the 2017 Asian Indoor and Martial Arts Games held in Ashgabat, Turkmenistan.

References

Living people
1989 births
Kazakhstani male taekwondo practitioners
Taekwondo practitioners at the 2014 Asian Games
Asian Games medalists in taekwondo
Asian Games bronze medalists for Kazakhstan
Medalists at the 2014 Asian Games
21st-century Kazakhstani people